Hasan Zyko Kamberi was a distinguished bejtexhi (bard) writer of Albanian literature.

Overview

He was born in the second half of the eighteenth century in Starje, a southern Albanian village near Kolonja at the foot of Mount Gramoz. All that is known of his life is that he took part in the Turkish-Austrian Battle of Smederevo on the Danube east of Belgrade in 1789 [1203 A.H.] in an army under the command of Ali Pasha Tepelena (1741–1822). He died a dervish, according to Elsie no doubt of the Bektashi sect, in his native village at the beginning of the nineteenth century. According to Arshi Pipa, there is no evidence that Kamberi belonged to the Bektashi order of Sufism.  His tomb in Starja was indeed turned into a Bektashi shrine known locally as the türbe of Baba Hasani.

Kamberi is one of the most commanding representatives of the Muslim tradition in Albanian literature, though his main work, a 200-page mecmua (verse collection), has disappeared. A manuscript of this collection is said to have been sent to Monastir (Bitola) in 1908-1910 to be published, but all traces of it have since been lost. Indeed little of his verse has survived and even less has been published. Of the works we do possess are: a short mevlud, a religious poem on the birth of the prophet Mohammed; about ten ilâhî; and over fifty secular poems.

Kamberi’s secular verse covers a wide range of themes. In his octosyllabic Sefer-i hümâyûn (The Felicitous Campaign) in thirty-three quatrains, he describes his participation in the above-mentioned Battle of Smederevo and gives a realistic account of the suffering it caused. In Bahti im (My fortune) and Vasijetnameja (The testament), Kamberi casts an ironic and sometimes bitter glance at the vagaries of fate and in particular at the misfortunes of his own life. Gjerdeku (The bridal chamber) portrays marriage customs in the countryside. It is not a pastoral idyll we encounter here, but a realistic account of the anguish and hardship of young women married off according to custom without being able to choose husbands for themselves, and the suffering of young men forced to go abroad to make a living. In Kamberi’s love lyrics, the author laments social conventions that inhibit passion and spontaneity. The most famous of his poems is Paraja (Money), a caustic condemnation of feudal corruption and at the same time perhaps the best piece of satirical verse in pre-twentieth century Albanian literature.

References

Albanian literature from Robert Elsie

18th-century Albanian poets
19th-century Albanian poets
18th-century births
19th-century deaths
Albanian Sufis
18th-century Albanian people
19th-century Albanian people
Bektashi Order
People from Kolonjë